Cannon and Castle is a military honor society founded at Yale University in 1929. Elected members include cadets and midshipmen from all three Reserve Officer Training Corps branches, active-duty servicemembers, veterans and faculty of the Yale community.

History 

On May 24, 1928, a group of students attending Yale College and the Sheffield Scientific School formed the Cannon and Castle military fraternity. The founders were all enrolled in the Department of Military Science and were members of field artillery and engineering units of Reserve Officer Training Corps (ROTC). The 22 founding members and four honorary members included:

 Francis Gordon Brown, Yale College
 Ralph William Carson, Sheffield Scientific School
 Clarence Phelps Dodge Jr., Yale College
 William Eno De Buys, Sheffield Scientific School
 Scott Jonathan Dow Jr., Sheffield Scientific School
 Charles Wetherbee Earnshaw, Sheffield Scientific School
 Martin Fentor, Yale College
 Robert Monroe Ferguson, Yale College
 Samuel Lawrence Gwin Jr., Yale College
 James Williamson Henning, Yale College
 Lt. Charles George Holle, honorary member
 John Alexander Hope, Yale College
 Gilman Derring Kirk, Sheffield Scientific School
 George Bragg Massey Jr., Sheffield Scientific School
 Clarence Whittlesey Mendell, dean of Yale College, honorary member
 Major Vernon Edward Pritchard, honorary member
 Henry Brown Reinhardt Jr., Sheffield Scientific School
 Hardie Scott, Yale College
 Dana Wentworth Smith, Sheffield Scientific School
 James Donald Strong, Sheffield Scientific School
 Charles Hyde Warren, Dean of  Sheffield Scientific School, honorary member
 Hubert Cushing Watson, Sheffield Scientific School
 Hamilton Washburn Wright Jr., Yale College

Its founders created Cannon and Castle to foster closer ties between Yale's two ROTC programs and to provide a forum for military-related discussions on campus. Membership was limited to those in ROTC field artillery and engineering units. By 1936, Cannon and Castle was referred to as an "honorary military society".

Each year, Cannon and Castle elected six members from the junior class. These members were selected for their "character, knowledge as reflected by general academic achievements and achievements in military science, and leadership qualities as demonstrated by performance as a cadet in the Reserve Officers Training Corps, and by contribution to the Yale Cadet Battalion." The six men would in turn, nominate twelve additional men for membership. Members were identified with a braid that could be worn on their uniform.

The society met every two weeks at various campus locations. It hosted lectures by military and foreign policy leaders, screened films, and held social events such as the annual Army-Navy Dance. It also offered the Col. Dean Hudnet Award for marksmanship in a competition that was open to any Military Science student at Yale. The award was name for a deceased professor of military science and tactics who was a member of the 1936 Olympic pistol team.

Cannon and Castle discontinued operations during World War II but reactivated in 1947 at its units' summer quarters in at Camp Campbell in Kentucky and Stewart Field in New York before returning to campus. However, Cannon and Castle ceased operations in 1967 during the Vietnam War and the eventual expulsion of ROTC from Yale in 1969. The Yale Archives houses Cannon and Castle's records and documents.

Current activities 
Cannon and Castle holds an induction ceremony and dinner for its elected members. Throughout the academic year, the society hosts special film screenings, debates, and guest lectures open to the public. Meetings are generally held in the Yale Naval ROTC unit wardroom on 55 Whitney Avenue.

Membership  
To be eligible for membership in Cannon and Castle, an individual must be an undergraduate enrolled in Yale College with military affiliation, whether active-duty, reserves or ROTC (which returned to Yale in 2012). Elected ROTC cadets and midshipmen are generally in the top 25% of their class merit standing and possess a GPA greater than 3.90 in their military science courses. Other members come from the Eli Whitney Scholar community. 

In exceptional circumstances, the society confers honorary membership to staff, faculty, graduate students, or fellows who have contributed significantly to the Yale military/veterans community. The commanding officers of Yale ROTC are ex-officio members of the society and sit on its Board of Regents, alongside society alumni members.

Notable alumni 
Cannon and Castle's members have participated in many of the major wars of the past century, including World War II, the Korean War, the Vietnam War, and the Global War on Terrorism. Notable alumni include:
 Leslie Aspin, 1960 – U.S. Secretary of Defense and eleven-terms in the U.S. House of Representatives
 David L. Boren, 1963 – three-term U.S. Senator, Governor of Oklahoma, and president of the University of Oklahoma
 Nicholas Dockery - 2023 M.A.S., Army Major, 2x Silver Star recipient, 2022 U.S. Army Soldier of the Year
 Michael  deVlaming Flynn – two-term Connecticut House of Representatives
 Porter Goss – U.S. House of Representatives, Director of Central Intelligence, and the first Director of the Central Intelligence Agency
 Hardie Scott, 1928 – U.S. House of Representatives
 James Donald Strong, 1928 – colonel in the U.S. Army Corps of Engineers; tennis official at Wimbledon Championships, the U.S. Open, the French Open, and the Australian Open

Notable honorary members 

 Christopher G. Cavoli – U.S. Army General and  Supreme Allied Commander Europe
 Charles George Holle, 1928 – U.S. Army Major General, Army Distinguished Service Medal recipient, deputy chief of the U.S. Army Corps of Engineers
 Paul Kennedy – historian
 Clarence Whittlesey Mendell, 1928 – Latin scholar, dean of Yale College
 Vernon Pritchard, 1928 – U.S. Army Major General, first-team All-American football player, Army Distinguished Service Medal recipient
 Charles Hyde Warren, 1928 – chair of Geology at Yale University, dean of the Sheffield Scientific School

See also 

 Honor society
 Professional fraternities and sororities

References 

Professional military fraternities and sororities in the United States
ROTC programs in the United States
New Haven, Connecticut
Yale College
Student organizations established in 1929
1929 establishments in Connecticut